The 2012 Esso Cup was Canada's fourth annual national women's midget hockey championship, which was played April 22–28, 2012 at MacLauchlan Arena inside the CARI Complex on the University of Prince Edward Island campus in Charlottetown, Prince Edward Island. The Pembina Valley Hawks from Manitoba won the gold medal with a 4–2 victory over the Thunder Bay Queens in the championship game. The Edmonton Thunder captured a medal for the third consecutive year by winning the bronze.

Teams

Round robin

Standings

Scores
 Metro 5 - Saguenay-Lac-St-Jean 1
 Pembina Valley 1 - Edmonton 0 (SO)
 Thunder Bay 12 - Capital District 1
 Pembina Valley 4 - Saguenay-Lac-St-Jean 0
 Thunder Bay 6 - Edmonton 1
 Metro 5 - Capital District 2
 Thunder Bay 8 - Saguenay-Lac-St-Jean 1
 Pembina Valley 2 - Metro 1
 Edmonton 4 - Capital District 0
 Thunder Bay 5 - Metro 2
 Saguenay-Lac-St-Jean 2 - Edmonton 1 (SO)
 Pembina Valley 4 - Capital District 2
 Edmonton 4 - Metro 0
 Thunder Bay 5 - Pembina Valley 4
 Capital District 3 - Saguenay-Lac-St-Jean 2

Playoffs
{{4TeamBracket
| RD1=Semifinals
| RD2=Gold Medal Game
| RD3=Bronze Medal Game

| RD1-seed1=4
| RD1-team1=Metro
| RD1-score1=2
| RD1-seed2=1
| RD1-team2=Thunder Bay
| RD1-score2=4
| RD1-seed3=3
| RD1-team3=Edmonton
| RD1-score3=1
| RD1-seed4=2
| RD1-team4=Pembina Valley
| RD1-score4=2

| RD3-seed1=4
| RD3-team1=Metro
| RD3-score1=1
| RD3-seed2=3
| RD3-team2=Edmonton
| RD3-score2=4

| RD2-seed1=2
| RD2-team1=Pembina Valley
| RD2-score1=4
| RD2-seed2=1
| RD2-team2=Thunder Bay'| RD2-score2=2
}}

Individual awards
 Most Valuable Player: Michela Cava (Thunder Bay)
 Top Scorer: Michela Cava (Thunder Bay)
 Top Forward: Jessica Gazzola (Thunder Bay)
 Top Defenceman: Madison Hutchinson (Pembina Valley)
 Top Goaltender: Brittni Mowat (Pembina Valley)
 Most Sportsmanlike Player: Breanna Lanceleve (Metro)

Road to the Esso Cup

Atlantic Region
Regional tournament held March 29–31 in Bathurst, New BrunswickMetro advances to Esso CupQuebec
Dodge Cup Midget Championship held April 12–15, 2012 at Laval, QuebecSaguenay-Lac-St-Jean wins Dodge Cup and advances to Esso CupOntario
Ontario Women's Hockey Association Championship held April 13–15, 2012 at Vaughan, OntarioThunder Bay advances to Esso CupWestern Region
Best-of-3 series played April 6–8, 2012 at Wilcox, SaskatchewanPembina Valley advances to Esso CupPacific Region
Best-of-3 series played April 6–8, 2012 at Surrey, British ColumbiaEdmonton advances to Esso Cup''

See also
 Esso Cup

References

External links
 Hockey Canada-Esso Cup Guide and Record Book
 2012 Esso Cup Home Page at HockeyCanada.com
 2012 Esso Cup Page at TSN.ca
 Road to the 2012 Esso Cup
 CARI Complex homepage, Esso Cup host venue

Esso Cup
Esso Cup
Sports competitions in Charlottetown
Ice hockey competitions in Prince Edward Island
2012 in Prince Edward Island